Victorinus (died 270) was emperor of the secessionist Gallic Empire in the late 3rd century.

Victorinus may also refer to:

Gaius Marius Victorinus (4th century), Roman grammarian, rhetorician and neo-Platonic philosopher
Victorinus (vicarius), a vicarius of Roman Britain probably serving between 395 and 406
Victorinus of Pettau (4th century), Christian scribe
Victorinus of Camerino, bishop and saint
Victorinus, Christian martyr and companion of Simplicius and Constantius
Saint Victorinus, martyr and saint who was a companion of Placidus
Saint Victorinus,  martyr and saint who was a companion of Maximus of Évreux
Saint Victorinus, martyr and saint who was a killed with Cassius of Clermont

See also
 Victorius (disambiguation)
 Victorious (disambiguation)